Ilavarasu is an Indian cinematographer and actor, who works in the Tamil film industry. He started his career as a cinematographer and worked for 13 films, winning a Tamil Nadu State Film Award for one of them. He, however, became better known as an actor, after he debuted and appeared in pivotal roles in Bharathiraja's and Cheran's films. He starred in over 160 Tamil films, mostly in supporting and comedian roles.

Career
According to T. Saravanan of The Hindu, Ilavarasu's debut film was to have been the unproduced Tamil film Top Tucker, and instead became Oru Kaidhiyin Diary (1984). However, Malathi Rangarajan of the same paper says he first appeared in a minuscule role in Bharathiraja's 1987 film Vedham Pudhithu.

Filmography

As actor

Films

Television

As cinematographer

As dubbing artist

References

External links
 

Indian Tamil people
Tamil male actors
Living people
Tamil film cinematographers
20th-century Indian male actors
Tamil comedians
Male actors in Tamil cinema
1964 births